The 1919 Auburn Tigers football team represented Auburn University in the 1919 college football season. It was the Tigers' 28th overall season and they competed as a member of the Southern Intercollegiate Athletic Association (SIAA). The team was led by head coach Mike Donahue, in his 15th year, and played their home games at Drake Field in Auburn, Alabama. They finished with a record of eight wins and one loss (8–1 overall, 5–1 in the SIAA) and as SIAA champions.

Before the season
The team's captain was tackle Pete Bonner. His brother Thomas Herbert "Herb" Bonner also attended Auburn and was a guard on the team.

Schedule

Season summary

Marion Military Institute
The season opened with a 37–0 victory over the Marion Military Institute.

Howard
In the second week of play, the Tigers had a poor showing but managed to beat Howard 19–6.

Camp Gordon

Sources:

Auburn came back to beat the Fifth Division of Camp Gordon 25–13 in a "nerve-wracking" game. Beretsky of the fifth division ran a kickoff 90 yards for a touchdown. The pounding of Red Howard and Ed Sherling led the comeback.

The starting lineup was Shirley (left end), Bonner (left tackle), Sizemore (left guard), Snider (center), Warren (right guard), Rogers (right tackle), Pruitt (right end), Trapp (quarterback), Scott (left halfback), Howard (right halfback), Shirling (fullback).

Clemson

Sources:

Auburn beat Clemson 7–0. "It was anybody's game until the last quarter", when Sherling scored Auburn's lone touchdown. Rodney Ollinger starred on defense.

The starting lineup was Ollinger (left end), Bonner (left tackle), Sizemore (left guard), Snider (center), H. Bonner (right guard), Rogers (right tackle), Pruitt (right end), Trapp (quarterback), Scott (left halfback), Howard (right halfback), Shirling (fullback).

at Vanderbilt

Sources:

Auburn suffered the season's only loss to Dan McGugin's Vanderbilt Commodores 7–6. Josh Cody returned a fumble 15 yards for a touchdown and made the winning extra point. A bit after, Ed Sherling ran in from the 1-yard line, but Pete Bonner missed goal.

Vanderbilt's Tom Lipscomb and Frank Goar were sent in on Auburn's last drive. Goar had been sick and Lipscomb was suffering from an injured ankle. The two spurned the team to victory in what the Vanderbilt yearbook called "the greatest defensive stand ever staged by any Vanderbilt team."

The starting lineup was Ollinger (left end), Bonner (left tackle), Sizemore (left guard), Snider (center), H. Bonner (right guard), Rogers (right tackle), Pruitt (right end), Trapp (quarterback), Scott (left halfback), Howard (right halfback), Shirling (fullback).

Georgia

Sources:

In heavy rain and mud, Auburn defeated Georgia 7–0. Red Howard ran through the entire Georgia team for 52 yards and the touchdown.

The starting lineup was Ollinger (left end), Bonner (left tackle), Sizemore (left guard), Caton (center), H. Bonner (right guard), Rogers (right tackle), Pruitt (right end), Trapp (quarterback), Williamson (left halfback), Howard (right halfback), Shirling (fullback).

Spring Hill
The Spring Hill Badgers, coached by Auburn great Moon Ducote, fell to Auburn  10–0. A slippery field led to weak punting. The starting lineup was Ollinger (left end), H. Bonner (left tackle), Griffin (left guard), Snider (center), Rogers (right guard), Martin (right tackle), Pruitt (right end), Trapp (quarterback), Shirey (left halfback), Stubbs (right halfback), Shirling (fullback).

Mississippi A&M

Sources:

In a meeting of unbeatens, Auburn beat the Mississippi Aggies 7–0. Herb Bonner recovered a fumble for the game's only touchdown. Rodney Ollinger was as a standout as a punter and on defense.

The starting lineup was Ollinger (left end), Bonner (left tackle), Warren (left guard), Caton (center), Rogers (right guard), H. Bonner (right tackle), Pruitt (right end), Trapp (quarterback), Williamson (left halfback), Howard (right halfback), Shirling (fullback).

at Georgia Tech

Sources:

In John Heisman's last game as Georgia Tech head coach, Auburn gave Tech its first loss to an SIAA school in five years (since Auburn won in 1914) by a 14–7 score. Fatty Warren proved the star of the game.

The first touchdown of the game was made by Jack McDonough. Judy Harlan later fell on his own punt for a safety. In the third quarter, Warren blocked a Dewey Scarboro punt and Sloan recovered the ball and ran it 35 yards for a touchdown. Warren "waddled" for a 40-yard touchdown off a Jimmy Brewster fumble for the 14–7 victory. Zelda Sayre sent captain Pete Bonner a telegram after the win, it read: "Shooting a seven, aren’t we awfully proud of the boys, give them my love—knew we could." She signed it "Zelder Sayre."

The starting lineup was Ollinger (left end), P. Bonner (left tackle), Sloan (left guard), Caton (center), Rogers (right guard), Warren (right tackle), Pruitt (right end), Trapp (quarterback), Stubbs (left halfback), Howard (right halfback), Shirling (fullback).

Postseason
For defeating Tech and due to charges of professionalism aimed at undefeated Centre, Auburn was SIAA champion. Fuzzy Woodruff recalls "Auburn claimed it. "We defeated Tech" said Auburn. "Yes, but we defeated you" said Vanderbilt. "Yes", said Alabama, "but Tech, Tulane ,and Tennessee took your measure. We defeated Georgia Tech, who tied Tulane, so we are champions...The newspapers, however, more or less generally supported the claim of Auburn..."

References

Additional sources
 

Auburn
Auburn Tigers football seasons
Auburn Tigers football